= Intel Teach =

Program by Intel

Intel Teach is a program established by Intel that aims to improve teacher effectiveness around the world by offering professional development courses and helping teachers integrate information and communications technology into their lessons.

Teachers are also trained to promote their students' problem-solving, critical thinking, and collaboration skills. Intel Teach claims to be the largest private-sector program of its kind, training more than 15 million teachers in 70 countries who will in turn influence the learning of over 300 million students.
